The 2008 France rugby union tour of Australia was a series of matches played in June–July 2008 in Australia by France national rugby union team. The French (with 12 "newcomers" and without the player of the club finalist of Top 14) lost heavily both test.

Results

References

France
tour
France national rugby union team tours
tour
Rugby union tours of Australia
History of rugby union matches between Australia and France